The St. Joseph Church-Convent of the Most Holy Sacrament Complex is a historic church complex located at the corner of Lavoisier Street and 7th Street in Gretna, Louisiana.

The  area includes:
 The St. Joseph Church, built in 1926 in Colonial Revival style with Spanish Baroque details.
 A convent and boarding school built in 1899. The three story brick structure was enlarged, with the addition of a wing containing the chapel, in 1907.
 A two-story stuccoed masonry school building built c.1940, considered a non contributing resource.
 A landscaped yard with an ornamental terra cotta fountain at its center.

The complex was added to the National Register of Historic Places on April 15, 1983. It was also included in Gretna Historic District at the time of its creation on May 2, 1985.

See also
 National Register of Historic Places listings in Jefferson Parish, Louisiana
 Gretna Historic District

References

Roman Catholic churches in Louisiana
Churches on the National Register of Historic Places in Louisiana
Roman Catholic churches completed in 1899
Churches in Jefferson Parish, Louisiana
National Register of Historic Places in Jefferson Parish, Louisiana
19th-century Roman Catholic church buildings in the United States